Jean Joseph Schlegel (24 October 1925 – 18 February 2020) was a French long-distance runner. He competed in the men's 5000 metres at the 1952 Summer Olympics.

References

External links
 

1925 births
2020 deaths
Athletes (track and field) at the 1952 Summer Olympics
French male long-distance runners
Olympic athletes of France
Sportspeople from Rennes
20th-century French people